Yūichirō, Yuichiro, Yuuichirou or Yuuichiroh is a masculine Japanese given name.

Possible writings
Yūichirō can be written using different combinations of kanji characters. Some examples:

The characters used for "ichiro" (一郎) literally means "first son" and usually used as a suffix to a masculine name, especially for the oldest son. The "yu" part of the name can use a variety of characters, each of which will change the meaning of the name ("勇" for courage, "優" for kindness, "悠" and so on).

勇一郎, "courage, first son"
雄一郎, "masculine, first son"
優一郎, "kindness, first son"
裕一郎, "abundant, first son"
佑一郎, "to help, first son"
祐一郎, "to help, first son"

Other combinations...

勇市郎, "courage, city, son"
雄市郎, "masculine, city, son"
裕市郎, "abundant, city, son"
佑市郎, "to help, city, son"

The name can also be written in hiragana ゆういちろう or katakana ユウイチロウ.

Notable people with the name

Yuichiro Ando (born 1959), Japanese-American painter
, Japanese politician
, Japanese director
, Japanese politician
, Japanese volleyball player
, Japanese mountain climber
, Japanese footballer
, Japanese kickboxer
, Japanese baseball player
, Japanese politician
, Japanese sumo wrestler
, Japanese long-distance runner
, Japanese politician

Fictional characters with the name 
, main character of the manga Seraph of the End

Japanese masculine given names